Argall is a surname, and may refer to:

 Audrey Argall (later Argall-Glasgow, 1898 – 1981), New Zealand freelance writer and magazine editor
 Dave Argall (born 1958), American politician
 John Argall (fl. 1604), English cleric and logician
 Philip Argall (1855–1912), Australian cricket Test match umpire
 Richard Argall (fl. 1621), a poet, of whom little is known and whose existence is disputed
 Samuel Argall (1572 or 1580–1626), English adventurer and naval officer
 In William Vollmann's historical novel Argall: The True Story of Pocahontas and Captain John Smith; Samuel Argall is the titular character